Endothelin-converting enzyme-like 1 is a protein that in humans is encoded by the ECEL1 gene.

This gene encodes a member of the neutral endopeptidase (NEP)-related family. It is expressed specifically in the nervous system. The gene disruption in mouse embryonic stem cells results in neonatal lethality due to respiratory failure shortly after birth. Based on the specific expression of this gene and the phenotype of the gene deficiency in mouse embryos, it is suggested that the protein encoded by this gene play a critical role in the nervous regulation of the respiratory system.

References

Further reading